Batley is a town and an unparished area in the metropolitan borough of Kirklees, West Yorkshire, England.  It contains 63 listed buildings that are recorded in the National Heritage List for England.  Of these, one is listed at Grade I, the highest of the three grades, two are at Grade II*, the middle grade, and the others are at Grade II, the lowest grade.  Included in the list are the districts of Brown Hill, Carlinghow, Staincliffe and Upper Batley.  During the 19th century, Batley became "Queen of the West Riding shoddy towns", shoddy being the process of breaking down rags and waste fabric to be re-used in the manufacture of uniforms.  The listed buildings remaining from this industry include a group of three-storey warehouses and showrooms in Station Road.  The other listed buildings include houses, cottages and associated structures, churches and items in churchyards, a milestone and boundary stones, a former watermill, a railway viaduct and subways, schools, civic buildings, banks, structures in the cemetery, a museum, a war memorial, and a pair of telephone kiosks.


Key

Buildings

References

Notes

Citations

Sources

Batley
Batley